Kevin Nicholson may refer to:

Kevin Nicholson (baseball) (born 1976), Canadian baseball player
Kevin Nicholson (footballer) (born 1980), English footballer
Kevin Nicholson (judge) on list of judges of the Supreme Court of South Australia
Kevin Nicholson (businessman), candidate for United States Senate election in Wisconsin, 2018